Dustin Charles Lynch (born May 14, 1985) is an American country music singer and songwriter, signed to Broken Bow Records. Lynch has released four albums and one EP for the label: a self-titled album in 2012, Where It's At in 2014, Current Mood in 2017, Ridin' Roads in 2019, and Tullahoma in 2020. A fifth album, Blue in the Sky, was released in February 2022. He has also released seventeen singles, of which eight have reached number one on Country Airplay.

Early life and education
Dustin Charles Lynch was born in Tullahoma, Tennessee, on May 14, 1985.

In 2003, Lynch graduated from Tullahoma High School. In 2007, Lynch graduated from Lipscomb University in Nashville, Tennessee with a B.S. degree in biology. He said he chose Lipscomb because it is located near the Bluebird Café where he would play and learn the craft of songwriting while attending college. Although Lynch said he was interested in going to medical school, he decided to pursue a career in music.

Music career
Lynch said he started playing guitar when he was around 8 or 9 but soon abandoned it, and then picked it up again at 15. When he was 16, he performed at the Bluebird Café in Nashville on an open mic night and was well received by the audience, so he decided to start a band.

2011–2013: Dustin Lynch

Lynch was first signed to Valory Music Group, and when one of its executives left to join Broken Bow Records, Lynch followed and signed with Broken Bow Records in late 2011. 
He released his debut single, "Cowboys and Angels" in January 2012. Lynch wrote the song with Josh Leo and Tim Nichols. That same month, Country Weekly began streaming his songs on its website.

The self-titled debut album, Dustin Lynch, was released in August 2012 and reached number one on the Top Country Albums chart.  The album's second single, "She Cranks My Tractor," became his second top 20 hit in early 2013. It was followed by "Wild in Your Smile," which made the top 30.

Lynch co-wrote the song "Somebody Somewhere" by Dallas Smith, as well as James Wesley's 2013 single "Thank a Farmer."

2014–2015: Where It's At

In early 2014, Lynch released his fourth single and the lead single from his second album, "Where It's At." It became his first number one single on the Country Airplay chart in September 2014, and the album of the same name was released on September 9, 2014. "Hell of a Night," and "Mind Reader" were released to country radio as the album's second and third singles, both of which also reached number one on the Country Airplay charts.

2016–2021: Current Mood and Tullahoma
"Seein' Red" was released on July 11, 2016 as the lead single from Lynch's third studio album Current Mood. It hit number one on the Country Airplay chart for the week dated February 25, 2017. "Small Town Boy" was released on March 20, 2017 as the second single. Following the album's release on September 8, 2017, "I'd Be Jealous Too" was released on October 23, 2017 as the album's third single.

In November 2017, Lynch made an appearance at the Macy's Thanksgiving Day Parade, performing his hit single "Small Town Boy." On September 18, 2018 he was inducted into the Grand Ole Opry. He co-wrote Brett Kissel's 2018 hit "Guitars and Gasoline."

In May 2018, Lynch released the single "Good Girl." An EP entitled Ridin' Roads was released on March 8, 2019. Its title track was released to country radio, and reached number one on the Country Airplay in 2020. It would also become the second single from his fourth studio album, Tullahoma, which was released on January 17, 2020. The album's third single "Momma's House" was released to country radio on February 3, 2020. "Red Dirt, Blue Eyes" was released to country radio in Australia as the third single on March 30, 2020. A re-recorded version of "Thinking 'Bout You" featuring MacKenzie Porter was released to country radio in May 2021.

2021–present: Blue in the Sky 
Ahead of his fifth studio album, Lynch released the promotional single "Tequila on a Boat" featuring Chris Lane, on May 14, 2021. The album, Blue in the Sky, was released on February 11, 2022, and features the single "Party Mode".

Discography

 Dustin Lynch (2012)
 Where It's At (2014)
 Current Mood (2017)
 Tullahoma (2020)
 Blue in the Sky (2022)

Awards and nominations

References

External links 

 
 

1985 births
American country singer-songwriters
American male singer-songwriters
BBR Music Group artists
Living people
Singer-songwriters from Tennessee
People from Nashville, Tennessee
Grand Ole Opry members
21st-century American singers
Country musicians from Tennessee
21st-century American male singers